Kum-Kosyak (Qom-Kosyak) is a rural locality (a village) in Malinovsky Selsoviet, Belebeyevsky District, Bashkortostan, Russia. The population was 41 as of 2010. There are 2 streets.

Geography 
Kum-Kosyak is located 13 km southeast of Belebey (the district's administrative centre) by road. Aksakovo is the nearest rural locality.

References 

Rural localities in Belebeyevsky District